
Dasgupta (pronounced ) is a common Bengali last name or surname in West Bengal and Bangladesh. The surname is found among the members of the Baidya caste.

Baidya or Vaidya is a Hindu community of Bengal.  A caste/jāti of Ayurvedic physicians, Baidyas have long occupied a place of pre-eminence in society alongside Brahmins and Kayasthas. In the colonial era, the Bhadraloks of Bengal were drawn from these top three castes, who continue to maintain a collective hegemony in West Bengal.

Geographical distribution
As of 2014, 62.2% of all known bearers of the surname Dasgupta were residents of India and 28.9% were residents of Bangladesh. In India, the frequency of the surname was higher than national average in the following states and union territories:
 1. West Bengal (1: 2,387)
 2. Tripura (1: 6,243)
 3. Arunachal Pradesh (1: 15,711)
 4. Delhi (1: 16,187)
 5. Daman and Diu (1: 18,685)
 6. Assam (1: 21,393)

Notable people

A
 Aloke Dasgupta, sitar player
 Alokeranjan Dasgupta, Bengali poet
 Amiya Kumar Dasgupta, Indian economist
 Asim Dasgupta (also known as Dr. Asim Kumar Dasgupta), West Bengal Ex Finance and Excise Minister.

B
 Basudeb Dasgupta, Bengali novelist and short-story writer
 Benu Dasgupta, cricketer
 Bijon Dasgupta, Art Director
 Biplab Dasgupta, Marxist economist
 Birsa Dasgupta, film director
 Buddhadev Dasgupta (born 1933), an Indian classical maestro who plays the sarod
 Buddhadev Dasgupta, (born 1944) Indian film-maker

C
 Chandan Dasgupta, Indian theoretical physicist
 Chidananda Dasgupta (born 1921), filmmaker, film critic and historian

D
 Deep Dasgupta, cricketer

G
 Gurudas Dasgupta (born 1936), senior trade-union leader, Communist Party of India, and Member of Parliament

H
 Hem Chandra Dasgupta, geologist

I
 Indraadip Dasgupta, music composer
 Indrani Dasgupta, Indian Supermodel.

J
 Jahar Dasgupta, painter
 Jishu Dasgupta, Bengali actor
 Jnanendra Das Gupta, Indo-Swedish chemist

K
 Kankar Shubra Dasgupta, scientist and academic
 Kamal Dasgupta, Bengali music director
 Khagendra Nath Dasgupta, Independence activist
 Kurchi Dasgupta, painter and writer
 Kinshuk Dasgupta, Scientist and Shanti Swarup Bhatnagar Awardee

M
 Mahananda Dasgupta, experimental physicist

N
 Nairanjana Dasgupta, statistician
 Nilanjana Dasgupta, social psychologist

P
 Partha Dasgupta, economist
 Poonam Dasgupta, actress
 Prabuddha Dasgupta, photographer
 Probal Dasgupta, linguist
 Prokar Dasgupta, urologist
 Purnendu Dasgupta, Indian-American academic

R
 Rabindra Kumar Das Gupta, scholar
 Rana Dasgupta, British-Indian writer
 Renuka Dasgupta, Bengali singer
 Roma Dasgupta (Suchitra Sen before marriage), Indian actress

S
 Samit Dasgupta, mathematician
 Sayantani DasGupta, Indian-American physician
 Shamik Dasgupta, comic book writer
 Shamita Das Dasgupta, social activist
 Shashibhusan Dasgupta, Bengali scholar in philosophy, languages and literature
 Somnath Dasgupta, academic and geologist
 Sudhangshu Dasgupta, CPI(M) politician
 Sudhin Dasgupta, Bengali music director
 Surendranath Dasgupta, Sanskrit scholar and philosopher
 Swagatalakshmi Dasgupta, singer
 Swapan Dasgupta, Indian journalist, MP, Politician

T
 Tanusri Saha-Dasgupta, Indian physicist

U
 Uma Dasgupta, Indian Actress

Y
 Yash Dasgupta, actor and model

See also 
Baidya
Sengupta

References 

Bengali Hindu surnames